is a retired Japanese professional boxer who was a former WBC Super flyweight Champion.

Sato captured the WBC super flyweight title in his first world title shot against Thailand's Suriyan Sor Rungvisai via twelve round unanimous decision after knocking him down twice in the third round in front of a mandatory challenger Sylvester Lopez at the Korakuen Hall in Tokyo on March 27, 2012.

See also 
List of WBC world champions
List of super flyweight boxing champions
List of Japanese boxing world champions
Boxing in Japan

References

External links
 

1984 births
Living people
World Boxing Council champions
World boxing champions
People from Morioka, Iwate
Japanese male boxers
Super-flyweight boxers